

See also
EHF Champions League
European Cup and EHF Champions League records and statistics

References

External links 
 EHF Champions League

EHF Champions League
European